Herewini Rangi is a New Zealand rugby league coach and former player who played one match in the NRL.

Early years
Rangi grew up in Huntly and played for the Taniwharau Rugby League Club. In 2001 he played for the Waikato Under-17s and also made the National U-17 team. He made the Junior Kiwis in 2002, playing both games.

Playing career
Rangi joined the New Zealand Warriors 25-man squad for 2004, moving to Auckland. The club assigned him to play for the Eastern Tornadoes in the Bartercard Cup. He played only one NRL game for the Warriors, against the Canberra Raiders. However, he was named Clubman of the Year at the end of season awards dinner. In 2004 he was also the leading scorer for the Tornadoes with 62 points and represented Auckland.

In 2005 he travelled across the Tasman to join the Central Comets in the Queensland Cup. He moved to the Wynnum Manly Seagulls in 2007, playing five Queensland Cup games and also representing the FOGS Cup team. 
 
In Round one of the 2008 FOGS Cup Herewini suffered a serious spinal injury when he collided with the goal post. It was originally feared he may have suffered permanent damage but this was later downgraded when he began to regain feeling in his arms and legs. He was still expected to require at least six months in hospital, but was released in May and returned to New Zealand.

Later years
In 2011 Rangi is coached the Taniwharau side in the Waicoa Bay competition. In 2012 he coached the Gisborne Tairawhiti team and was appointed the Gisborne KiwiSport Officer.

References

1984 births
Living people
Auckland rugby league team players
Date of birth missing (living people)
Eastern Tornadoes players
Junior Kiwis players
New Zealand Māori rugby league players
New Zealand rugby league coaches
New Zealand rugby league players
New Zealand Warriors players
Rugby league hookers
Rugby league players from Huntly, New Zealand
Taniwharau Rugby League Club players
Waikato rugby league team players
Wynnum Manly Seagulls players